Babar Javed is a Pakistani television and film producer and director. He has produced and directed universally acclaimed series such as Meri Zaat Zarra-e-Benishan, Qaid-e-Tanhai, Mera Saaein, Main Abdul Qadir Hoon, Aasmanon Pay Likha, Bashar Momin, Adhoora Bandhan, and Mor Mahal, all under his production company A&B Entertainment that he co-founded with actor turned filmmaker Asif Raza Mir. Javed has earned eight Lux Style Awards as a director and producer. In 2016, he received his first ARY Film Award nomination for producing 2015 biopic film Manto.

Career
In 2009, Babar co-founded a production company  A&B Entertainment and actor Asif Raza Mir and produced projects for Hum TV, ARY Digital and Geo TV. Their debut project Diya Jalay starring Samiya Mumtaz earned them critical praise and their claim to fame came with 2010 ensemble cast drama serial also starring Mumtaz, Meri Zaat Zarra-e-Benishan by Umera Ahmed that earned the duo as producers recognition and positive appraisal. In 2013 the duo merged their production company with Geo TV for producing and directing channel's projects only, prior to merger they usually created projects for ARY Digital and Geo Entertainment.

Filmography

Following is the selected list of Film and TV series Produced and Directed by Javed:

Awards and nominations

See also

 List of programs broadcast by Geo TV

References

External links
 
  
  
 GeoANB Entertainment

A&B Entertainment
Living people
Pakistani television directors
Pakistani television producers
Year of birth missing (living people)
People from Karachi